NGC 6188 is an emission nebula located about 4,000 light years away in the constellation Ara. The bright open cluster NGC 6193, visible to the naked eye, is responsible for a region of reflection nebulosity within NGC 6188.

NGC 6188 is a star forming nebula, and is sculpted by the massive, young stars that have recently formed there – some are only a few million years old.  This spark of formation was probably caused when the last batch of stars went supernova.

References

External links

6188
Emission nebulae
Star-forming regions
Ara (constellation)